Richland is a city in Stewart County, Georgia, United States. Per the 2020 census, the population was 1,370.

History
The community took its name from the local Richland Baptist Church, the name of which most likely is a transfer from Richland, South Carolina, the native home of a large share of the first settlers. The Georgia General Assembly incorporated Richland in 1889.

Geography
Richland is located along U.S. Route 280 and Georgia State Route 520 (known as South Georgia Parkway). U.S. Route 280 and Georgia 520 lead northwest  to Columbus. The two highways separate in the city, with U.S. Route 280 leading east  to Americus and Georgia 520 leading southeast  to Albany.

Demographics

2020 census

Note: the US Census treats Hispanic/Latino as an ethnic category. This table excludes Latinos from the racial categories and assigns them to a separate category. Hispanics/Latinos can be of any race.

2000 Census
As of the census of 2000, there were 1,794 people, 624 households, and 413 families residing in the city. The racial makeup of the city was 62.54% African American, 35.95% White, 0.11% Native American, 0.22% from other races, and 1.17% from two or more races. Hispanic or Latino of any race were 2.73% of the population.

There were 624 households, out of which 29.8% had children under the age of 18 living with them, 35.6% were married couples living together, 27.2% had a female householder with no husband present, and 33.8% were non-families. 30.4% of all households were made up of individuals, and 15.2% had someone living alone who was 65 years of age or older. The average household size was 2.51 and the average family size was 3.15.

In the city, the population was spread out, with 24.1% under the age of 18, 8.2% from 18 to 24, 24.4% from 25 to 44, 21.3% from 45 to 64, and 22.0% who were 65 years of age or older. The median age was 40 years. For every 100 females, there were 85.1 males. For every 100 females age 18 and over, there were 80.2 males.

The median income for a household in the city was $24,597, and the median income for a family was $29,423. Males had a median income of $26,313 versus $17,269 for females. The per capita income for the city was $14,127. About 17.3% of families and 23.8% of the population were below the poverty line, including 30.1% of those under age 18 and 25.8% of those age 65 or over.

Notable people

Birthplace of Lillian Gordy Carter, mother of former president of the United States Jimmy Carter
Jarvis Jones, Retired NFL linebacker for the Pittsburgh Steelers
Steve Sanders, child actor and vocalist for Oak Ridge Boys

References

Gallery

Cities in Georgia (U.S. state)
Cities in Stewart County, Georgia